Nataša Bekvalac (born 25 September 1980) is a Serbian singer from Novi Sad. 

She made her recording debut in 2001 and has since released five studio albums. Additionally, Bekvalac has released several duets, including "Gospodine" (2011) and "Muško više ne mogu" (2019) with Emina Jahović, "Mala plava" (2018) with Coby, "Neprijatelj" (2018) with Magla Band, and "Iz daleka" (2021) with Rasta.

Early life
Bekvalac was born on 25 September 1980 in Novi Sad, SFR Yugoslavia. She is the daughter of footballer and coach, Dragoljub Bekvalac. Bekvalac grew up as the middle child with two sisters. In 1989, she performed with the band Regina at the children's music festival Deca pevaju hitove. Bekvalac also appeared on the popular variety show hosted by Minja Subota, called Mužički tobogan, the following year. 

Before pursuing a career in music, she graduated from a senior coaching school.

Career
At 17 years of age, Bekvalac made her professional debut at the 1998 Beogradsko proleće festival with the song "Mojoj ljubavi". Her first album, titled Ne brini, was released in 2001 under City Records. The song "Laži me" was presented a year prior at the pop music festival Sunčane Skale in Herceg Novi. Ne brini was followed by Ništa lično (2002) and Stereo ljubav (2004), which included stand-out hits like "Mali signali", "Nikotin" and "Ponovo".

In November 2010, Bekvalac released Ne valjam. Between 2011 and 2014, she released a series of singles, including "Pozitivna" (2012), "Kraljica novih ljubavi" (2013) and "Mogu da prođem" (2014). Bekvalac performed alongside other artists like Ceca and Kiki Lesendrić at the 2014 New Year's Eve concert in front of the House of the National Assembly. Her fifth album Original was released in June 2016. It was preceded by singles "Original" and "Pseto" a year before.  In 2016, Bekvalac also debuted as an actress, starring as Queen Draga Mašin in the musical Tajna Crne ruke. In 2018, she was a judge on the fifth season of the children's music competition Pinkove Zvezdice.

On the Valentine's Day 2020, she held her first solo concert at the Belgrade Arena, titled S.O.S. za ljubav (S.O.S. for Love). In June 2020, Bekvalac performed a live stream concert via Serbian streaming service YouBox, which attracted close to 100,000 viewers. During the live show she was joined by her childhood musical influence, Bebi Dol. In September 2022, she embarked on a six-date American solo tour, performing mainly for Serbian diaspora.

Public image
In public surveys, Bekvalac has been cited as one of the most successful public figures from Novi Sad.

Recognized for publicly supporting LGBT rights in Serbia, she received the title of a Serbian gay icon in 2019. During 2021, she advocated for the legalization of same-sex partnerships in Serbia. Later that year, Bekvalac served as the "godmother" of the 2021 Belgrade Pride, where she stated that she is not an ally to the community, but a "part of it".

Personal life
Bekvalac has also received widespread media attention because of her personal life. She has been married three times and has two daughters. In 2004, she started dating Serbian waterpolo player Danilo Ikodinović. They married in July 2006. The couple welcomed their daughter Hana on 17 March 2007. After five years of marriage, Bekvalac divorced from Ikodinović in 2011.

Between 2015 and 2017, she was married to handball player Ljubomir Jovanović. Subsequently, she married IT entrepreneur Luka Lazukić. Bekvalac gave birth to her second daughter, named Katja, on 28 February 2018. On the night of April 12, she was physically assaulted by her then husband. In April the following year, Lazukić was charged for domestic assault and was sentenced to 8 months of prison. Bekvalac filled for a divorce from Lazukić in October 2019.

Discography 
Studio albums
 Ne brini (2001)
 Nista lično (2002)
 Stereo ljubav (2004)
 Ne Valjam (2010)
 Original (2016)

Awards and nominations

See also
Music of Serbia
List of singers from Serbia
Serbian pop

References

1980 births
Living people
Actors from Novi Sad
21st-century Serbian women singers
Serbian pop singers
Serbian LGBT rights activists
Musicians from Novi Sad
Models from Novi Sad
Megatrend University alumni
Serbian LGBT singers

External links